The Yaté Dam is an arch dam on the Yaté River in Yaté commune of New Caledonia, France. The primary purpose of the dam is hydroelectric power generation and it supports a 68 MW power station. Plans for the project began in the early 1950s and the dam was designed by Coyne et Bellier. The owner and operator of the project, New Caledonian Society Energy (ENERCAL), was established on 27 August 1955 to implement the project. Construction began that year and the power station was commissioned in 1958. The dam and entire scheme was inaugurated by Jacques Soustelle, then Minister of State in charge of Overseas Departments, on 21 September 1959. It is the tallest dam and creates the largest reservoir in New Caledonia.

While the main retaining portion of the dam is an arch design, it also has a concrete gravity section and an earthen and rock-fill section. Within the power station lies four 17 MW Francis turbine-generates which produce an average of 307 GWh annually.

References

Dams in New Caledonia
Dams completed in 1959
Arch dams
Hydroelectric power stations in New Caledonia
Energy infrastructure completed in 1958